Gennaro Scognamiglio (born 24 April 1987) is an Italian footballer who plays as a centre back for  club Giugliano.

Early career
Born in Gragnano, Campania, he started his career in the youth teams of Treviso and later Salernitana. In 2005, he was signed to play for Serie D side Savoia, but didn't make any appearances for the first team in competitive matches. He moved on to Sangiuseppese, where he made 61 appearances, scoring 1 goal.

Career
Scognamiglio signed for Crotone in Serie B in 2008. He made a six-month loan to Cosenza but was released by Crotone the day after its expiry and became a free agent. He was soon signed by Juve Stabia, where he remained for three years. In 2013, he moved to Parma but was immediately loaned to Perugia for one year. He left Parma soon after the expiry of the loan, moving to Benevento without making a single appearance for the Emilia-Romagna team. Scognamiglio remained at Benevento for one year, making 34 appearances and scoring 6 goals, establishing himself as a solid player for Juan Landaida's side as they were crowned champions of Lega Pro Group C, and gained promotion to Serie B. In the summer of 2015, Scognamiglio signed for Pisa, but he stayed in Tuscany for less than a month before being signed by Novara, back in Serie B.

Novara
Scognamiglio made his Novara debut on 13 August 2016, playing 120 minutes of the 1-0 (AET) win over Latina in the 2016–17 Coppa Italia. His league debut came nearly a month later, playing the full game against former club Pisa in a 1–0 loss. He scored his first goal for the club in Serie B Match Day 19, netting in the 39th minute of an eventual 3–1 win over Cesena.

Pescara
On 26 July 2018, he joined Serie B club Pescara.

Avellino
On 19 July 2021, he signed a two-year contract with Avellino.

Giugliano
On 11 January 2023, Scognamiglio joined Giugliano on a two-year deal.

References

External links
 

1987 births
Living people
Footballers from Campania
Sportspeople from the Province of Naples
Italian footballers
Association football defenders
Serie B players
Serie C players
Serie D players
A.C. Savoia 1908 players
F.C. Sangiuseppese players
F.C. Crotone players
A.S. Cosenza Calcio players
S.S. Juve Stabia players
Parma Calcio 1913 players
A.C. Perugia Calcio players
Benevento Calcio players
Trapani Calcio players
Pisa S.C. players
Novara F.C. players
A.C. Cesena players
Delfino Pescara 1936 players
U.S. Avellino 1912 players
S.S.C. Giugliano players